The Wuhan–Xianning intercity railway, commonly abbreviated as Wu-Xian intercity railway, is a high-speed commuter railway line in Hubei Province of China with double tracks. It connects the provincial capital Wuhan with the city of Xianning, with a number of intermediate stops throughout Wuhan's southern suburbs. The railway is part of Wuhan Metropolitan Area intercity railway system.

Intermediate stations is include Nanhu East railway station (in Wuhan's Guanggu area), several stations in Wuhan's suburban Jiangxia District and in Xianning City (Xian'an District).

Although there are already two railway lines between Wuhan and Xianning (the Wuhan–Guangzhou high-speed railway and the older "conventional" Beijing–Guangzhou railway), the new railway is supposed to complement them, rather than compete with them. Unlike the Wuhan–Guangzhou high-speed railway, which has no passenger stations between Wuhan and Xianning, and the Xianning North railway station is somewhat out of town, the new intercity railway will serve a number of towns and township between the two city, and will have Xianning East railway station in downtown Xianning. Besides, the intercity line's terminal in Wuhan (the Wuchang railway station) is more convenient for most passengers than the Wuhan railway station used by the Wuhan–Guangzhou high-speed railway. As to the "conventional" Beijing–Guangzhou railway, its trains are much slower and aren't frequent, since that railway's capacity is now mainly used for freight or long distance passenger services.

The travel time between Wuchang and Xianning on the intercity railway (28 min) will be only a few minutes longer than the one the Wuhan–Guangzhou high-speed railway, while the fare will be somewhat lower.

The railway began operation on December 28, 2013 with 10 services each direction per day.

At Tangxunhu railway station, transfer is available to the Optics Valley (Guanggu) Line of Wuhan Tram.

Notes

Transport in Hubei
High-speed railway lines in China
Railway lines opened in 2013
2013 establishments in China